Meredates ( Mihrdāt) was a Parthian prince who ruled the state of Characene, a vassal of the Parthian Empire and important trading port, which he ruled from  to 150/151.

Biography 
Meredates was a son of the Parthian King of Kings Pacorus II. The Kingdom of Characene had since 141 BC been ruled by Hyspaosines and his descendants as Parthian vassals; the last king of the line, Attambelos VII without much trouble submitted to the Roman emperor Trajan in 116 AD. However, with Trajans failure and death the following year, Attambelos VII political authority collapsed. The Parthians most likely put an end to Hyspaosinid rule in the region and appointed one of their own on the throne. During his rule, Meredates became a powerful client-king, due to his commercial leadership and a lucrative alliance with the Palmyrene merchants.

In 147, a Parthian prince named Vologases IV staged a coup d'état and succeeded Vologases III in 147, marking the establishment of a new branch of the Arsacid dynasty on the Parthian throne. Meredates, member of the overthrown Arsacid branch, and in possession of vast amount of resources, posed a great danger to Vologases IV; in 150/51AD, Vologases IV invaded Characene and defeated Meredates, and appointed Orabazes II, most likely a relative of his, as the new king of the region. Vologases IV's forces seized a statue of Heracles, the patron god of the Characenian royalty. The statue was taken to the temple of Apollo in Seleucia, where it was displayed as a demonstration of Vologases IV's victory. A bilingual inscription (Greek and Parthian) was carved on the statue, which recounts Vologases IV's conquest of Characene:

References

Sources
 
 
 
 
 

Kings of Characene
2nd-century monarchs in the Middle East
2nd-century Iranian people
Zoroastrian rulers
Vassal rulers of the Parthian Empire
Arsacid dynasty of Characene

de:Meredates